Apolipoprotein B deficiency is an autosomal dominant disorder resulting from a missense mutation which reduces the affinity of apoB-100 for the low-density lipoprotein receptor (LDL Receptor). This causes impairments in LDL catabolism, resulting in increased levels of low-density lipoprotein in the blood. The clinical manifestations are similar to diseases produced by mutations of the LDL receptor, such as familial hypercholesterolemia. Treatment may include, niacin or statin or ezetimibe.

It is also known as "normotriglyceridemic hypobetalipoproteinemia".

See also 
 Familial hypercholesterolemia

References

External links

Skin conditions resulting from errors in metabolism
Lipid metabolism disorders